Greenan is a surname. Notable people with the surname include:

Gerard Greenan (born 1950), Canadian politician
Laurie Greenan (1947–2020), American costume designer
Russell H. Greenan (born 1925), American writer
Terisa Greenan (born 1967), American film producer, director, writer, and actress